Arthur Caron (December 16, 1883 - July 4, 1914) was a French Canadian anarchist and a member of the Industrial Workers of the World. He masterminded an attempt to assassinate John D. Rockefeller using a bomb constructed from dynamite. While building the device, he was killed along with Carl Hanson, and Charles Berg on July 4, 1914, when his bomb prematurely exploded. The blast also killed a renter of the building who was not part of the plot and injured dozens of others.  In the wake of Caron's death, some 5,000 mourners gathered in New York's Union Square, where anarchist leaders Alexander Berkman and Rebecca Edelsohn among others spoke in memory of those who died.

References

1883 births
1914 deaths
Anarchist assassins
Failed assassins
Canadian anarchists
Industrial Workers of the World members
Lexington Avenue explosion
Deaths by improvised explosive device in the United States
Canadian revolutionaries